The 2008 Kerry Senior Football Championship was the 108th staging of the Kerry Senior Football Championship since its establishment by the Kerry County Board in 1889. The draw for the opening round fixtures took place on 15 March 2008. The championship ran from 17 May to 30 November 2008.

Feale Rangers entered the championship as the defending champions, however, they were beaten by South Kerry in the quarter-finals.

The final replay was played on 30 November 2008 at FitzGerald Stadium in Killarney, between Mid Kerry and Kerins O'Rahilly's in what was their first ever meeting in the final. Mid Kerry won the match by 1-07 to 0-09 to claim their fourth championship title overall and a first title in 16 years.

Declan Quill was the championship's top scorer with 1-33.

Team changes

To Championship

Promoted from the Kerry Intermediate Football Championship
 None

From Championship

Relegated to the Kerry Intermediate Football Championship
 Milltown/Castlemaine

Results

Preliminary round

Round 1

Round 2

Relegation playoffs

Round 3

Dingle received a bye in this round.

Quarter-finals

Semi-finals

Final

Championship statistics

Top scorers

Overall

In a single game

Miscellaneous
 Mid Kerry win a first title in 16 years.
 Mid Kerry qualify for the final for the first time since 1992.
 Kerins O'Rahilly's qualify for the final for the first time since 2002.
 The final goes to a replay for the first time since 2003.
 Kerins O'Rahilly's play in the Munster Senior Club Football Championship.
 Ten time winners John Mitchels are relegated from senior level for the first time.
 Despite winning the 2007 Intermediate Championship Annascaul choose not to move up to senior.

References

Kerry Senior Football Championship
2008 in Gaelic football